is a 1956 Japanese drama film written and directed by Kaneto Shindo.

Cast
 Nobuko Otowa as Kakuko Mori
 Chikako Hosokawa as Tsukiko, Kakuko's mother
 Shinsuke Ashida as Shinichirō Yagi
 Sen Hara as Chiyo, Akio's mother
 Sumiko Hidaka as Yugiku Yoshiya
 Tanie Kitabayashi
 Kei Taguchi as Tabata
 Taketoshi Naitō as Akio Satomi
 Eitarō Ozawa as Tarō Fujie
 Zenpei Saga as Sugisaburō
 Koreya Senda as Yasuda
 Ichirō Shimizu as Kunijirō Matsukawa
 Taiji Tonoyama
 Eijirō Tōno as Tadao Inoue
 Jūkichi Uno as Toshirō Yamashita

References

External links
 

1956 films
1956 drama films
Japanese drama films
1950s Japanese-language films
Films directed by Kaneto Shindo
Films scored by Akira Ifukube
Japanese black-and-white films
1950s Japanese films